The History of Early Analytic Philosophy Society (HEAPS) is a philosophical society founded to study early analytic philosophy. The society examines the work of Gottlob Frege, Bertrand Russell, Ludwig Wittgenstein, Frank P. Ramsey, G. E. Moore, and other early contributors to the field. The Society sponsors conference sessions in conjunction with the American Philosophical Association.

External links 
HEAPS website

Philosophical societies in the United States
Analytic philosophy
Organizations based in New York City